TT-30 may refer to:
TT pistol, a Soviet semi-automatic pistol
NEMA TT-30, a type of mains electricity connector